Blake Stephens is  an American politician from the U.S. state of Oklahoma. A member of the Republican Party, he currently serves in the Oklahoma Senate as the elected member from the 3rd district. He was first elected in the 2020 Oklahoma Senate election after defeating incumbent Wayne Shaw in the Republican primary on June 30, 2020 and going on to win the general election on November 3, 2020. His current term expires in 2025.

Early life and career
Stephens graduate from Sapulpa High School and was the Sapulpa Future Farmers of America president . He earned a bachelor's degree in agricultural education from Northeastern Oklahoma A&M College. He worked on an assembly line, as a residential therapist, and as a manager. He later received a graduate degree in counseling from Northeastern State University. He then worked at Locust Grove Public Schools as a counselor for over two decades. He also owns a family ranch in Moodys, Oklahoma.

Stephens ran for governor in the 2018 Oklahoma gubernatorial election. In December 2020, Stephens signed onto a letter requesting the Oklahoma Congressional delegation to not certify the 2020 election results.

Oklahoma State Senate (2021–present)
Stephens defeated incumbent Wayne Shaw in the Republican primary on June 30, 2020. He then went on to  win the 2020 Oklahoma Senate election for district 3. He served in the 58th Oklahoma Legislature.

58th Legislature
Sen. Stephens co-authored  SB 834, the 'Back the Blue' Bill, to allow cities to paint blue lines and other "signage for the purpose of expressing support for law enforcement". The bill passed the Oklahoma Senate 39–6. He also authored  SB 644 which would allow cities to authorize their employees to carry concealed firearms on the job if properly licensed. Stephens wrote  HB 1564 which was introduced in the Oklahoma House of Representatives by Tom Gann. The bill substantially expands the power of landlords to carry out evictions.

Electoral history

Notes

References

Living people
21st-century American politicians
Republican Party Oklahoma state senators
Year of birth missing (living people)
Candidates in the 2018 United States elections
Ranchers from Oklahoma
People from Tahlequah, Oklahoma